{{DISPLAYTITLE:C11H12N2O}}
The molecular formula C11H12N2O (molar mass: 188.23 g/mol) may refer to:

 Indolepropionamide (IPAM)
 Phenazone, or antipyrine
 Vasicine (peganine)

Molecular formulas